The Swedish Hockey Association (SLHF) is the national hockey association in Sweden.

The Swedish Hockey Association was founded in 1973 as interest in field hockey in Sweden increased substantially following the 1972 Summer Olympics in Munich. SLHF and is a member of the Swedish Sports Confederation (RF), the Swedish Olympic Committee (SOK), the European Hockey Federation (EHF) and International Hockey Federation (FIH). Its headquarters are in Gothenburg.

History

External links
 Swedish Hockey Association (Official Website)

National members of the European Hockey Federation
Hockey
Field hockey in Sweden
Sports organizations established in 1973

References